This article is about the demographic features of the population of Serbia; including vital statistics, ethnicity, religious affiliations, education level, health of the populace, and other aspects of the population.

History

Censuses in Serbia ordinarily take place every 10 years, organized by the Statistical Office of the Republic of Serbia. The Principality of Serbia had conducted the first population census in 1834; the subsequent censuses were conducted in 1841, 1843, 1846, 1850, 1854, 1859, 1863 and 1866 and 1874. During the era Kingdom of Serbia, six censuses were conducted in 1884, 1890, 1895, 1900, 1905 and the last one being in 1910. During the Kingdom of Yugoslavia, censuses were conducted in 1931 and 1921; the census in 1941 was never conducted due to the outbreak of World War II. Socialist Yugoslavia conducted censuses in 1948, 1953, 1961, 1971, 1981, and 1991. The two most recent censuses were held in 2002 and 2011.

The years since the first 1834 Census saw frequent border changes of Serbia, first amidst the disintegration of the Ottoman Empire and Austria-Hungary, then subsequent formation and later disintegration of Yugoslavia and, finally, 2008 partially recognized independence of Kosovo which affected territorial scope in which all these censuses have been conducted.

Total fertility rate 1860–1949
The total fertility rate is the number of children born per woman. It is based on fairly good data for the entire period. Sources: Our World In Data and Gapminder Foundation.

Vital statistics

Source: Statistical Office of the Republic of Serbia 
Data for Serbia excluding Kosovo.

Current vital statistics

Birth statistics by districts

Birth rate by municipalities 1961–2020

Marriages and divorces

Data for Serbia excluding Kosovo.

Ethnic groups

Situated in the middle of the Balkans, Serbia is home to many different ethnic groups. According to the 2011 census, Serbs are the largest ethnic group in the country and constitute 83.3% of population. Hungarians are the largest ethnic minority in Serbia, concentrated predominately in northern Vojvodina and representing 3.5% of the country's population (13% in Vojvodina). Roma people constitute 2% of the total population but unofficial estimates put their actual number to be twice or three as high. Bosniaks are third largest ethnic minority mainly inhabiting Raška region in southwestern and most southern part of the country. Other minority groups include Croats (0.9%), Slovaks (0.8%), Albanians, Montenegrins (0.5%), Romanians (0.4%), Macedonians (0.3%), and Bulgarians (0.3%). The Chinese and Arabs are the only two significant immigrant minorities, with the former often using Serbia as a transient country on their way to Western Europe.

Religion

Serbia is largely a homogeneous Eastern Orthodox nation, with Catholic and Muslim minorities, among other smaller confessions.

Orthodox Christians number 6,079,396 or 84.5% of country's population. The Serbian Orthodox Church is the largest and traditional church of the country, adherents of which are overwhelmingly Serbs. Other Orthodox Christian communities in Serbia include Montenegrins, Macedonians Romanians and Bulgarians.

There are 356,957 Roman Catholics in Serbia, roughly 5% of the population, mostly in Vojvodina (especially its northern part) which is home to minority ethnic groups such as Hungarians, Croats, Bunjevci, Albanians, as well as to some Slovaks and Czechs. Protestantism accounts for about 1% of the country's population, chiefly among Slovaks in Vojvodina as well as among Reformist Hungarians.

Muslims, with 222,282 or 3% of population, form third largest religious group. Islam has a strong historic following in the southern regions of Serbia, primarily in southern Raška. Bosniaks are the largest Islamic community in Serbia; estimates are that some third of country's Roma people are Muslim.

Languages

The official language is Serbian, member of the South Slavic group of languages, and is native to 6,330,919 or 88% of the population. Recognized minority languages are: Hungarian (mother tongue to 243,146 people or 3.4% of population), Slovak, Romanian, Bulgarian, and Rusyn as well as Bosnian and Croatian which are completely mutually intelligible with Serbian and in recent history were considered part of the single Serbo-Croatian pluricentric language. All these languages are in official use in municipalities or cities where more than a 15% of population consists of national minority. In Vojvodina, provincial administration uses, besides Serbian, five other languages (Hungarian, Slovak, Romanian, Croatian, and Rusyn).

Largest cities

Migration

Emigration

Immigration

Foreign citizens in Serbia in 2016.

After the start of the Russian invasion of Ukraine, more than 100,000 Russian citizens and 18,000 Ukrainian citizens arrived in Serbia within 7 months.

Other demographic data
Data that follows has been derived from the Ministry of Demography and Population Policy of Serbia Official website

Median age of the population
Total: 43.16 years (2018)	
Male: 41.73 years	
Female: 44.53 years		 
	
Mother's mean age at first birth
28.4 years (2018)

Number of marriages per 1000 inhabitants
5.2 marriages/1,000 population (2018)

Median age of the groom at the time of marriage
34.2 years (2018)

Median age of the bride at the time of marriage
31.1 years (2018)

Number of divorces per 1000 marriages
275.2 divorces/1,000 marriages (2018)

Education

According to 2011 census, literacy in Serbia stands at 98% of population while computer literacy is at 49% (complete computer literacy is at 34.2%). Same census showed the following levels of education: 16.2% of inhabitants have higher education (10.6% have bachelors or master's degrees, 5.6% have an associate degree), 49% have a secondary education, 20.7% have an elementary education, and 13.7% have not completed elementary education.

Health

The life expectancy in Serbia at birth is 74.8 years, 71.9 for males and 77.7 for females. Serbia has a comparatively old overall population (among the 10 oldest in the world), with the average age of 42.9 years.

See also
Demographic history of Serbia
Demographic history of Vojvodina
Demographic history of Kosovo
 
 Demographics of the Kingdom of Yugoslavia
 Demographics of the Socialist Federal Republic of Yugoslavia
 Demographics of Serbia and Montenegro

References

Sources

Further reading
 
  (PDF)

 
Society of Serbia
Demographics of Yugoslavia
Demographics of Europe